Agnes de Mansfeldt is an 1836 historical novel by the Irish writer Thomas Colley Grattan, published in three volumes. It was his third novel, although he remained best known for his travelogue. Like the previous two it was strongly influenced by the Waverley novels of Walter Scott. It is set around the time of the Cologne War of the 1580s, provoked in part by the marriage of Agnes von Mansfeld-Eisleben to the Elector of Cologne and his conversation to Protestantism. In his preface, Grattan draws parallels between these historical events and the contemporary situation following the Belgian Revolution and the 1831 Treaty of London.

References

Bibliography
 Fenoulhet, Jane, Quist, Gerdi & Tiedau, Ulrich (ed.). Discord and Consensus in the Low Countries, 1700-2000. UCL Press, 2016.
 Loeber, Rolf, Stouthamer-Loeber, Magda & Burnham, Anne Mullin. A Guide to Irish Fiction, 1650-1900. Four Courts, 2006.

1836 British novels
19th-century Irish novels
Novels set in Germany
British historical novels
Novels set in the 16th century
Works by Thomas Colley Grattan